The women's 4 × 100 metre medley relay event at the 1980 Summer Olympics was held on 20 July at the Swimming Pool at the Olimpiysky Sports Complex.

Records
Prior to this competition, the existing world and Olympic records were as follows.

The following records were established during the competition:

Results

Heats

Final

References

R
1980 in women's swimming
Women's events at the 1980 Summer Olympics